Yusuf Qaafow (born June 19, 1987) is a Somali professional basketball player. At a professional level, he played for the Melbourne Tigers and then the Brisbane Spartans from 2009 until 2017, and has since been a basketball coach running his own academy called the Hard Knockz Academy. Abdi was born in Somalia and moved to Australia where he began playing basketball at the age of 12. He opted to represent his country of birth, Somalia national basketball team where he was born in 1987. As a captain of the Somalia national football team throughout the 2010s, he has served as the nations longest served team captain thus far. Qaafow has claimed that he aims to take Somalia back to its team high of 1981 when it won the bronze medal at FIBA Africa, or its stable period in 1992 when Somalia last took part at FIBA Africa before the imminent absent spell for many years thereafter.

References 

Sportspeople from Mogadishu
Shooting guards
Somalian men's basketball players
Men's basketball coaches
1987 births
Living people